Ring Finger Protein 113A is a protein that in humans is encoded by the RNF113A gene. It is found in humans on the X Chromosome. RNF113A contains two highly conserved domains, the RING (Really Interesting New Gene) finger domain and Zinc finger domain. RING finger domains have been associated with some tumor suppressors and cytokine receptor-associated molecules. These domains also act in DNA repair and mediating protein-protein interactions. Aliases of RNF113A across taxa include RNF113, CWC24, and ZNF183.

Gene
The gene is found on the human X Chromosome and reverse strand. The specific locus in humans is Xq24. RNF113A contains 1312 nucleotides.

Gene Structure
An upstream in-frame stop codon is found within the 5' UTR. RNF113A is an intronless gene with one isoform in humans.

Protein
RNF113A translates a human protein 343 amino acids long and molecular weight of 38.8 kiloDaltons. The protein is found ubiquitously in the human body.

Yeast Two Hybrid Screens link RNF113A with other proteins. Most of these proteins are currently known to function in the human Spliceosome. Some of these associations are within the U4, U5, and U6 snRNPs much the same as within yeast models.

Protein Structure
RNF113A also contains one acetylation and four phosphorylation sites. The protein has both an acetylation and four phosphorylation sites which have been confirmed experimentally. Additional phosphorylation sites and one glycosylation site are also predicted. The N terminus or 3' end of the gene contains the conserved RING and Zinc finger domains. The RING finger domain contains a cross-brace motif consisting of 6 Cystines and 1 Histidine.The Zinc finger is formed by 3 Cystines and 1 Histidine Typically, RING finger domains are located near the C terminus or 5' end of the protein rather than the N terminus making RNF113A unique. RING finger proteins also usually have multiple types of domains outside of the Zinc finger family.

Secondary structure of the RING domain has been confirmed for the paralog, RNF113B. Two Beta sheets and one Alpha helix are present within the domain. A second Alpha helix is present on the 5' side of the RING domain.

Function

Human
The RNF113A protein was identified as a phosphoprotein in a human prostate cancer cell line but the function was not tested. Online Mendelian Inheritance in Man (OMIM) links mutation of RNF113A with trichothiodystrophy 5, nonphotosensitive. One case study reported a nonsense mutation resulting from changing a cytosine to a thymidine in RNF113A that causes X-linked recessive trichothiodystrophy.  Mothers are the carriers for the disease and display only slightly altered phenotypes that were linked to the mutation compared to their more severely affected sons. Myelodysplastic syndrome and 5q-syndrome have also been linked to an upregulation of ZNF183, an alias of RNF113A. It appears RNF113A may allow for a more stable activated spliceosome and post-catalytic spliceosome.

Yeast
The yeast ortholog Cwc24p is predicted to have a spliceosome function. The protein acts in a complex with Cef1p to process pre-rRNA. The splicing is dependent on the Zinc finger and RING finger domains.

Drosophila
The ortholog in fruit flies has been suggested to act as a spliceosome. Based on the observed phenotype of incomplete neuroblast differentiation, the ortholog is hypothesized to be involved in splicing namely within the central nervous system. Additional research conclude a cytosine to thymidine nonsense mutation such as that of trichothiodystrophy discussed above has resulted in abnormal development in which tissues of the ectoderm germ layer are affected.

Nematodes
The Caenorhabditis elegans Tag-331 ortholog has been linked to larval arrest and legality when a knock-out is created The RNF-113 ortholog has been predicted to function as an ubiquitin ligase that is involved in DNA repair of inter-strand crosslinks

Paralog
RNF113B is the primate-specific retrogene of RNF113A. The gene is a rare example of intron gain into a gene. In humans, RNF113B is found on Chromosome 13.  RNF113B mRNA transcript contains an upstream in-frame stop codon. The protein has both a RING finger domain (really interesting new gene) and a zinc finger motif.

RNF113B currently is not associated with any human diseases according to the Online Mendelian Inheritance in Man (OMIM) database. Preliminary research has suggested the gene to be linked to development and differentiation. RNF113B has also been predicted to be a part of the ubiquitin ligase family and involved with DNA repair mechanisms after treatment with cisplatin, a chemotherapy drug that induces DNA inter-strand crosslinks. Further research indicates RNF113B is transcribed in a wide assortment of tissues. The transcripts can be spliced or unspliced and this action is specific to the tissue of expression. However, the mechanisms and functions of this gene specially in these tissues are still unknown.

Homology
Orthologs have been found in mammals, birds, reptiles, amphibians, fish, and invertebrates. Distant orthologs have been recognized in fungi, yeast, and plants. The zinc finger domain and RING finger domain are the regions of highest conservation. The upstream region displays the most conservation in mammals.

The table above displays the results of an NCBI Blast from 2015 with selected taxa from main branches of vertebrates and invertebrates. This is not a complete list.

References

Spliceosome
RING finger proteins
Zinc finger proteins